Hart Island is a minor island in Washington.  It is located near the city of Sedro-Woolley on the Skagit River, and is carved out by the Hart Slough. DeBays Island is adjacent to Hart Island.

References 

River islands of Washington (state)
Islands of Skagit County, Washington